Otávio Müller de Sá (born August 6, 1965), most known as Otávio Müller, is a Brazilian actor. Most known for comical roles in television, such as in the Rede Globo's series Tapas & Beijos, he is also a stage actor, and film actor. On theater, he starred in the monologue A Vida Sexual da Mulher Feia, and, on cinema, he won the Rio Film Festival Best Actor Award for The Gorilla.

He was married to Preta Gil and had a son, Francisco. Now, he is married to Adriana Junqueira with whom he had two daughters, Maria and Clara.

Selected filmography
 Vale Tudo (1988)
 Força de um Desejo (1999–2000)
 Memórias Póstumas (2001)
 Desejos de Mulher (2002)
 Paraíso Tropical (2007)
 Os Amadores (2007)
 Craft (2010)
 Tapas & Beijos (2011–2013)
 Past Minutes (2013)
 Alemão (2014)
 Loveling (2018)
 Three Summers (2019)

References

External links

1965 births
20th-century Brazilian male actors
21st-century Brazilian male actors
Brazilian male film actors
Brazilian male stage actors
Brazilian male television actors
Living people
Male actors from Rio de Janeiro (city)